Thomas Dobbie Thomson Walkinshaw (14 August 1946 – 12 December 2010) was a British racing car driver from Scotland and the founder of the racing team Tom Walkinshaw Racing (TWR). He was also involved in professional rugby union, as owner of Gloucester Rugby, and chairman of the team owners organisation for the Aviva Premiership.

Racing career

Walkinshaw was born at Mauldslie Farm, near Penicuik, Midlothian, Scotland.  He began racing in 1968, starting in an MG Midget, before moving on to a Lotus Formula Ford car. The following year he won the Scottish FF1600 title at the wheel of a Hawke. 
In 1970, he entered the British Formula Three championship with Lotus. He later moved to the March 'works' team, where he broke his ankle in a racing accident. Continuing his career despite this setback, he drove in many classes, including Formula 5000 and Formula Two.

Ford hired Walkinshaw to drive a Capri on the British Touring Car Championship circuit in 1974. This resulted in him winning his class that year. In 1976 Walkinshaw established Tom Walkinshaw Racing (TWR), continuing to drive for his own team. He competed in the 1976 World Championship for Makes, sharing a Hermetite-sponsored BMW 3.5 CSL with John Fitzpatrick. The pair achieved several good results including a dramatic victory, by just 1.3 seconds, in the Silverstone 6 Hours. In 1984 he won the European Touring Car Championship in a 5.3-litre, V12 Jaguar XJS.

In September 1984, Walkinshaw had teamed up with Australian driver John Goss to drive an Australian Group C spec XJS in the Bathurst 1000. After qualifying in 10th spot, Walkinshaw never left the starting line after transmission failure and was hit from behind by a Chevrolet Camaro. Several cars also joined the crash causing the race to be red flagged and restarted 30 minutes later (the first restart in the race's history).

In 1985, Jaguar retired the XJS from Group A racing and TWR was forced to use the cars they'd been racing in the British Touring Car Championship, the 3.5-litre V8 Rover Vitesse in the European Touring Car Championship. Walkinshaw and Percy won 6 of the 14 races in the championship but could only finish the championship 3rd behind the Eggenberger Volvo 240T's of Gianfranco Brancatelli and Thomas Lindström.

With Australia's move to Group A in 1985, Walkinshaw vowed to return to Bathurst with his ETCC Jaguars in a bid to win the Australian classic. The three ETCC Jags were brought out of retirement and shipped to Bathurst with the help of "Jaguar Rover Australia" (JRA) and proceeded to dominate practice and qualifying, with Walkinshaw claiming pole position, Jeff Allam claiming second spot on the grid and provisional pole sitter John Goss starting 6th. Driving with regular ETCC co-driver Win Percy, Walkinshaw finished 3rd in the race after leading for over ⅔ distance following a split oil line late in the race. The Allam/Ron Dickson car was out after 3 laps with engine failure when broken glass from the cars right headlight got sucked into the intake system, while the Goss/Armin Hahne car would win for TWR after having to battle for over 100 laps of the 6.172 km (3.835 mi) long Mount Panorama Circuit with a broken drivers seat which had to be held in place by cable ties attached to the roll cage.

The Rovers, with sponsorship from Bastos/Texaco, were again the TWR cars for the renamed ETCC (which had become the FIATCC in 1986 in anticipation of the 1987 World Touring Car Championship). Walkinshaw was again a favourite to take out the title, but once again would finish 3rd. Co-driver Win Percy was originally announced as the 1986 champion before results from earlier races were amended following protest hearings. Walkinshaw had intended to return to Bathurst in 1986 with the V12 Jaguars but withdrew when JRA refused to help with funds following a downturn in the Australian car market.

With sponsorship from the NZ based Strathmore Group, Walkinshaw took the Jaguars to Japan and New Zealand for the 1986 Fuji InterTEC 500 and the XJS' final race, the 1987 Wellington 500. Walkinshaw comfortably led the race for the first 6 laps from teammate Jeff Allam and Australian Peter Brock in his Holden Dealer Team VK Commodore before retiring with no oil pressure.

After entering into a partnership with Australian car manufacturer Holden in February 1987 (at the expense of Brock's HDT Special Vehicles operation), Walkinshaw fully intended to compete in the inaugural World Touring Car Championship driving a 4.9-litre V8 Holden VL Commodore SS Group A, but withdrew before the first race at Monza in protest at the US$60,000 entrance fee imposed by Bernie Ecclestone who had put in charge of the WTCC by the FIA. Walkinshaw and Jeff Allam appeared with the car at the Nürburgring round of the championship but the car was uncompetitive against the new Ford Sierra RS Cosworths and BMW M3s, retiring with brake problems.

In 1988 TWR developed the Holden VL Commodore SS Group A SV and Walkinshaw again teamed with Jeff Allam at the RAC Tourist Trophy at Silverstone. Although still not a match for the Ford Sierra RS500s, Walkinshaw qualified the Commodore in 9th place. The pair finished the race in 15th place following various problems with the car.

Tom Walkinshaw's last race as a driver was the 1988 Tooheys 1000 at Bathurst. In partnership with Australian Larry Perkins, TWR shipped the ETCC Commodore to Australia for the race as part of the Holden Special Vehicles team. Following a messy lead up to the race, which included Walkinshaw illegally protesting the five leading Australian built Sierras, Walkinshaw and Allam qualified in 13th place (slower than the Perkins Engineering built team car), and was the second retirement after just 5 laps with rear suspension failure. Walkinshaw himself was cross-entered in the Perkins/Denny Hulme car and drove the car later in the race. The car was retired with engine failure after 137 laps while in 2nd place. Walkinshaw's protest against the Sierras was later found to be illegal because Perkins Engineering was the entrant for the HSV team and not TWR. The stewards of the meeting had erred in letting Walkinshaw lodge the protest under TWR's FIA licence as only a race entrant was entitled to lodge protests under the rules of the meeting. In an ironic twist to Walkinshaw's last race meeting as a driver, the three HSV team cars, including the team's spare car, were found to have illegal modifications to the steering racks after a counter-protest by Dick Johnson Racing team manager Neal Lowe, though no action was taken as the spare car didn't start the race and both race cars failed to finish.

Following the Tooheys 1000, Walkinshaw retired from driving to concentrate on the management of TWR's increasing motorsports portfolio.

Team management

In 1975 Walkinshaw established Tom Walkinshaw Racing (TWR), a group whose business was the manufacture and design of racing and road cars. TWR ran touring car programmes in the mid-1970s and early 1980s. In 1983 the TWR team took eleven wins in eleven races in the British Saloon Car Championship running Rover Vitesses, before being stripped of the title for a technical infringement. TWR also ran a Jaguar XJ-S ETCC touring car programme before taking on their World Sportscar Championship programme. In six years the programme won Le Mans twice and the World Championships three times. The same team brought engineer Ross Brawn to prominence.

In 1991 Walkinshaw was recruited as Engineering Director of the Benetton F1 team which subsequently won the 1995 Formula One World Championship. He was involved in the recruitment of Michael Schumacher by Benetton after the German's Formula One debut with the Jordan team. As Engineering Director, his role also came under scrutiny when the team was investigated for suspected technical infringements during the 1994 season, including the potential use of banned electronic aids and unauthorised modifications to the refuelling apparatus used on the cars. Although illegal software was found in the Benettons, the FIA had no evidence that it had ever been used in a race and no action was taken against the team.

For 1995 Walkinshaw bought 50% of the Ligier team from Benetton team principal Flavio Briatore. His intention was to take over the team completely, but he was unable to purchase 100% of the team and therefore pulled out of the deal. Instead he bought the Arrows team, achieving a coup for the 1997 Formula One season by recruiting reigning world champion Damon Hill to his squad.

In 1997 Walkinshaw was voted Autocar Man of the Year. By this stage the TWR Group employed 1500 employees in the UK, Sweden, Australia and the United States. At the time, Walkinshaw was also managing director of Arrows Grand Prix International.

His TWR racing group went into liquidation in 2002 after the Arrows team ran out of money. This led to the Australian arm of the operation being bought by Holden. However, since the practice of teams being owned by manufacturers in the Supercars Championship is banned, Holden had to divest the team's assets and sell the Holden Racing Team to lead driver Mark Skaife, and K-Mart Racing (later HSV Dealer Team) to John and Margaret Kelly (the parents of V8 Supercar drivers Todd and Rick).

In 2005 Tom Walkinshaw returned to the V8 Supercars Australia and began a new relationship with his former teams, HSV Dealer Team and Holden Racing Team, helping lead Holden to its first series win since 2002 through driver Rick Kelly (2006) and Garth Tander (2007). In late 2006 Walkinshaw Performance bought the small Australian sports car manufacturer Elfin Cars. In 2007 Walkinshaw Performance acquired a 50% stake in the Holden Racing Team, and in 2008 fully re-acquired the team from Skaife Sports. 2009 saw the debut of Walkinshaw Racing a two car operation known individually as Bundaberg Red Racing and Team Autobarn.

Personal life
Walkinshaw died on Sunday 12 December 2010, aged 64, from complications arising from cancer. He is survived by his first wife Elizabeth Walkinshaw and their son Fergus Walkinshaw, and his second wife Martine Walkinshaw and their sons Ryan and Sean. Walkinshaw's memorial service was held at Gloucester Cathedral on 4 February 2011.

Ryan and Sean followed their father into motorsport, Ryan in management as one of the team principals of the racing team that wears the family name, Walkinshaw Andretti United, the descendant of the Australian arm of Tom Walkinshaw Racing. The team is co-owned by Andretti Autosport and United Autosports and races in the Australian Supercars Championship. Sean as a racing driver who competes regularly in GT racing, most often in GT3 spec series like GT World Challenge Europe.

Career summary
Results sourced from Driver Database and History of Touring Car Racing.

Complete World Sportscar Championship results
(key) (Races in bold indicate pole position) (Races in italics indicate fastest lap)

Complete British Saloon / Touring Car Championship results
(key) (Races in bold indicate pole position – 1973–1990 in class) (Races in italics indicate fastest lap – 1 point awarded ?–1989 in class)

† Events with 2 races staged for the different classes.

‡ Ineligible to score points.

Complete European Touring Car Championship results
(key) (Races in bold indicate pole position) (Races in italics indicate fastest lap)

Complete World Touring Car Championship results
(key) (Races in bold indicate pole position) (Races in italics indicate fastest lap)

† Not eligible for series points

Complete Asia-Pacific Touring Car Championship results
(key) (Races in bold indicate pole position) (Races in italics indicate fastest lap)

Complete 24 Hours of Le Mans results

Complete Spa 24 Hour results

Complete Bathurst 1000 results

Notes

References
 

Scottish racing drivers
Formula One team owners
Formula One team principals
Scottish motorsport people
English rugby union chairmen and investors
Gloucester Rugby
Sportspeople from Midlothian
1946 births
2010 deaths
British Touring Car Championship drivers
24 Hours of Le Mans drivers
24 Hours of Spa drivers
Deaths from lung cancer
World Sportscar Championship drivers
European Touring Car Championship drivers
People from Penicuik
Arrows Grand Prix International
Benetton Formula
20th-century English businesspeople
20th-century Scottish businesspeople
Ecurie Ecosse drivers